Claude Couinaud (12 February 1922, in Neuilly-sur-Seine – 4 May 2008, in Paris) was a French surgeon and anatomist who made significant contributions in the field of hepatobiliary surgery. He is best known for his detailed anatomic studies of the liver and was the first to describe its segmental anatomy. These anatomic facts permitted the development of hepatectomies.

His book Le Foie: Études anatomiques et chirurgicales
stands as the seminal work on hepatobiliary surgery and anatomy of the 20th century.

Bibliography

References

1922 births
People from Neuilly-sur-Seine
French surgeons
French anatomists
2008 deaths
Liver surgeons
20th-century surgeons